Duval County is in the northeastern part of the U.S. state of Florida.  As of the 2020 census, the population was 995,567, up from 864,263 in 2010. Its county seat is Jacksonville, with which the Duval County government has been consolidated since 1968. Duval County was established in 1822, and is named for William Pope Duval, Governor of Florida Territory from 1822 to 1834. Duval County is the central county of the Jacksonville Metropolitan Statistical Area.

History
This area had been settled by varying cultures of indigenous peoples for thousands of years before European contact. Within the Timucuan Ecological and Historic Preserve in Jacksonville, archeologists have excavated remains of some of the oldest pottery in the United States, dating to 2500 BCE. Prior to European contact, the area was inhabited by the Mocama, a Timucuan-speaking group who lived throughout the coastal areas of northern Florida. At the time Europeans arrived, much of what is now Duval County was controlled by the Saturiwa, one of the region's most powerful tribes. The area that became Duval County was home to the 16th-century French colony of Fort Caroline, and saw increased European settlement in the 18th century with the establishment of Cowford, later renamed Jacksonville.

Duval County was created in 1822 from St. Johns County. It was named for William Pope Duval, Governor of Florida Territory from 1822 to 1834. When Duval County was created, it covered a massive area, from the Suwannee River on the west to the Atlantic Ocean on the east, north of a line from the mouth of the Suwannee River to Jacksonville on the St. Johns River. Alachua and Nassau counties were created out of parts of Duval County in 1824. Clay County was created from part of Duval County in 1858. Part of St. Johns County south and east of the lower reaches of the St. Johns River was transferred to Duval County in the 1840s.

Government

On October 1, 1968, the government of Duval County was consolidated with the government of the city of Jacksonville. The Duval County cities of Atlantic Beach, Jacksonville Beach, and Neptune Beach, and the town of Baldwin are not included in the corporate limits of Jacksonville, and maintain their own municipal governments. The city of Jacksonville provides all services that a county government would normally provide.

Geography
The topography is coastal plain; however there are some rolling hills.

National protected areas
 Fort Caroline National Memorial
 Timucuan Ecological and Historic Preserve

Adjacent counties
 Nassau County - north and northwest
 St. Johns County - southeast
 Clay County - southwest
 Baker County - west

Demographics

As of the 2020 United States census, there were 995,567 people, 369,704 households, and 225,060 families residing in the county.

2010 Census
U.S. Census Bureau 2010 Ethnic/Race Demographics:
 White (non-Hispanic) (60.9% when including White Hispanics): 56.6% (10.7% German, 10.6% Irish, 9.2% English, 4.1% Italian, 2.3% French, 2.1% Scottish, 2.1% Scotch-Irish, 1.8% Polish, 1.2% Dutch, 0.6% Russian, 0.6% Swedish, 0.6% Norwegian, 0.5% Welsh, 0.5% French Canadian)
 Black (non-Hispanic) (29.5% when including Black Hispanics): 28.9% (1.7% Subsaharan African, 1.4% West Indian/Afro-Caribbean American [0.5% Haitian, 0.4% Jamaican, 0.1% Other or Unspecified West Indian, 0.1% Bahamian])
 Hispanic or Latino of any race: 7.6% (2.5% Puerto Rican, 1.7% Mexican, 0.8% Cuban)
 Asian: 4.2% (1.7% Filipino, 0.8% Indian, 0.6% Other Asian, 0.4% Vietnamese, 0.3% Chinese, 0.2% Korean, 0.1% Japanese)
 Two or more races: 2.9%
 American Indian and Alaska Native: 0.4%
 Native Hawaiian and Other Pacific Islander: 0.1%
 Other Races: 2.1% (0.9% Arab)

In 2010, 6.7% of the population considered themselves to be of only "American" ancestry (regardless of race or ethnicity.)

Of the 342,450 households 28.68% had children under the age of 18 living with them, 41.92% were married couples living together, 16.74% had a female householder with no husband present, and 36.27% were non-families. 24.85% of households were one person and 8.05% (2.29% male and 5.76% female) had someone living alone who was 65 or older. The average household size was 2.47 and the average family size was 3.04.

The age distribution was 23.5% under the age of 18, 10.5% from 18 to 24, 28.4% from 25 to 44, 26.4% from 45 to 64, and 11.1% 65 or older. The median age was 35.8 years. For every 100 females there were 94.3 males. For every 100 females age 18 and over, there were 91.6 males.

The median household income was $49,463 and the median family income  was $60,114. Males had a median income of $42,752 versus $34,512 for females. The per capita income for the county was $25,854. About 10.4% of families and 14.2% of the population were below the poverty line, including 20.3% of those under age 18 and 9.6% of those aged 65 or over.

In 2010, 9.0% of the county's population was foreign born, with 49.5% being naturalized American citizens. Of foreign-born residents, 38.2% were born in Latin America, 35.6% born in Asia, 17.9% were born in Europe, 5.8% born in Africa, 2.0% in North America, and 0.5% were born in Oceania.

2000 Census
The racial makeup of the county was 65.80% White (63.6% were Non-Hispanic White,) 27.83% African American or Black, 0.33% Native American, 2.71% Asian, 0.06% Pacific Islander, 1.31% from other races, and 1.96% from two or more races. 4.10% of the population were Hispanic or Latino of any race.

Of the 303,747 households 33.30% had children under the age of 18 living with them, 46.50% were married couples living together, 15.60% had a female householder with no husband present, and 33.60% were non-families. 26.50% of households were one person and 7.80% were one person aged 65 or older. The average household size was 2.51 and the average family size was 3.06.

The age distribution was 26.30% under the age of 18, 9.60% from 18 to 24, 32.40% from 25 to 44, 21.20% from 45 to 64, and 10.50% 65 or older. The median age was 34 years. For every 100 females there were 94.20 males. For every 100 females age 18 and over, there were 90.90 males.

The median household income was $40,703 and the median family income  was $47,689. Males had a median income of $32,954 versus $26,015 for females. The per capita income for the county was $20,753. 11.90% of the population and 9.20% of families were below the poverty line, including 16.40% of those under the age of 18 and 11.60% of those age 65 or older.

Languages
As of 2010, 87.36% of all residents spoke English as their first language, while 5.74% spoke Spanish, 1.18% Tagalog, 0.53% Arabic, 0.48% Serbo-Croatian, 0.47% Vietnamese, and 0.46% of the population spoke French Creole (mostly Haitian Creole) as their mother language. In total, 12.64% of the population spoke languages other than English as their primary language.

Politics

Voter registration
According to the Secretary of State's office, Democrats comprise a plurality of registered voters in Duval County.

Statewide and national elections
Duval County is somewhat conservative for an urban county, and it began moving away from the Democratic Party sooner than the majority of Florida counties. Despite the small Democratic plurality in registration, the county's Democrats are nowhere near as liberal as their counterparts in other large Florida counties, such as Miami-Dade and Orange. The county has only supported a Democrat for president three times since 1952, in 1960, 1976, and 2020.

However, the Republican edge in Duval has lessened somewhat in recent years. It swung from a 16-point win for George W. Bush in 2004 to only a three-point win for John McCain in 2008. Mitt Romney won an equally narrow margin in 2012 and in 2016, Donald Trump only won the county by fewer than 6,000 votes even as he narrowly carried Florida. In 2020, Joe Biden, despite losing statewide, broke the 44-year Democratic drought in Duval County, winning by less than four points.

In 2018, Andrew Gillum, despite losing the election, won Duval by 4 points, the first time a Democrat has won the county in a gubernatorial election since Steve Pajcic's losing bid in 1986. Four years later, however, Duval rebounded to vote for Ron DeSantis by over 10 points. In the Senate elections, Bill Nelson only failed to carry the county in his first bid in 2000, and Lawton Chiles and Bob Graham have carried the county in all three of their respective bids.

Education

Duval County Public Schools operates public schools in the county.

Duval County is served by the Jacksonville Public Library.

Communities
 842,583 - Jacksonville
 21,823 - Jacksonville Beach
 12,985 - Atlantic Beach
 7,124 - Neptune Beach
 1,430 - Baldwin

2013 estimate population

Transportation

Public transportation 
Public transportation is provided by the Jacksonville Transportation Authority.

Major highways

Airports
 Cecil Airport
 Herlong Recreational Airport
 Jacksonville Executive at Craig Airport
 Jacksonville International Airport

See also
 National Register of Historic Places listings in Duval County, Florida
 List of tallest buildings in Jacksonville

Notes

References

External links

Government links

Elected constitutional offices
 Duval County Property Appraiser
 Duval County Supervisor of Elections
 Duval County Tax Collector
 Jacksonville Sheriff's Office
 Duval County Clerk of the Courts

Special districts
 Duval County Public Schools
 St. Johns River Water Management District

Judicial branch
 Duval County Clerk of Courts
 Public Defender, 4th Judicial Circuit of Florida serving Duval, Clay, and Nassau Counties
 Office of the State Attorney, 4th Judicial Circuit of Florida
 Circuit and County Court, 4th Judicial Circuit of Florida

Tourism
 Jacksonville and the Beaches Convention and Visitors' Bureau

 
1822 establishments in Florida Territory
Charter counties in Florida
Counties in the Jacksonville metropolitan area
North Florida
Populated places established in 1822